Daryl Richard Peoples (born 7 January 1947) is a former Australian rules footballer who played with Fitzroy in the Victorian Football League (VFL).

Notes

External links 

Living people
1947 births
Australian rules footballers from Victoria (Australia)
Fitzroy Football Club players
Ararat Football Club players